Cotana is a genus of moths in the family Eupterotidae.

Species
 Cotana affinis Rothschild, 1917
 Cotana albaserrati (Bethune-Baker, 1910)
 Cotana albomaculata (Bethune-Baker, 1904)
 Cotana aroa (Bethune-Baker, 1904)
 Cotana bakeri (Joicey & Talbot, 1917)
 Cotana biagi (Bethune-Baker, 1908)
 Cotana bisecta Rothschild, 1917
 Cotana brunnescens Rothschild, 1917
 Cotana castaneorufa Rothschild, 1917
 Cotana dubia (Bethune-Baker, 1904)
 Cotana eichhorni Rothschild, 1932
 Cotana erectilinea (Bethune-Baker, 1910)
 Cotana germana Rothschild, 1917
 Cotana joiceyi Rothschild, 1917
 Cotana kebeae (Bethune-Baker, 1904)
 Cotana lunulata (Bethune-Baker, 1904)
 Cotana meeki Rothschild, 1917
 Cotana neurina Turner, 1922
 Cotana pallidipascia Rothschild, 1917
 Cotana postpallida (Rothschild, 1917)
 Cotana rosselliana Rothschild, 1917
 Cotana rubrescens Walker, 1865
 Cotana serranotata (T.P. Lucas, 1894)
 Cotana splendida Rothschild, 1932
 Cotana tenebricosa (Hering, 1931)
 Cotana unistrigata (Bethune-Baker, 1904)
 Cotana variegata Rothschild, 1917

Former species
 Cotana calliloma Turner, 1903

References

Eupterotinae
Macrolepidoptera genera